The 2022 Alaska state elections took place on November 8, 2022. The state also held Regional Educational Attendance Area (REAA) elections on the first Tuesday in October.

Federal Elections

United States Senate Seat (Class III) 

Incumbent  Republican  U.S. Senator Lisa Murkowski was originally appointed to the  Senate in 2002, winning subsequent elections in  2004,  2010, and  2016.

Under Alaska's recently-adopted election system, the state conducted a nonpartisan blanket primary. Murkowski finished first (with 45.05% of the vote), ahead of Republican Kelly Tshibaka (38.55%),  Democrat Pat Chesbro (6.82%), and Republican Buzz Kelly (2.13%). Murkowski, Tshibaka, Chesbro, and Kelly all advanced to the  ranked-choice general election.

In the first round of tabulation in the general election, Murkowski finished first (with 44.37% of the vote); Tshibaka finished in a close second (42.64%). Chesbro received 10.74% of the vote, while Buzz Kelly received 2.88%.

Murkowski won the election with 53.69% of the vote in the third round of tabulation.

United States House of Representatives

Special Election 

Incumbent Republican representative Don Young died on March 18, 2022, after serving as representative for 49 years. A special election was held on August 16 to fill the rest of his term, resulting in Democrat Mary Peltola beating Republicans Sarah Palin and Nick Begich using the state's newly implemented ranked-choice voting system.

General Election 

Peltola ran for election to a full-term, again against Palin and Begich. Republican Tara Sweeney originally placed fourth in the nonpartisan blanket primary, but withdrew. She was replaced by  Libertarian Chris Bye, who finished the primary in fifth place.

In the first round of general election voting, Peltola came in first with 48.77% of the vote to Palin's 25.74%, Begich's 23.33%, and Bye's 1.73%. In the third round, Peltola won the election with 54.96% of the vote.

State Offices

Governor 

Incumbent  Republican  Governor  Mike Dunleavy was originally elected to the position in 2018 with 51.4% of the vote. He ran for re-election in 2022.

In Alaska's nonpartisan blanket primary, Dunleavy and his running mate, former Commissioner of the Alaska Department of Corrections Nancy Dahlstrom, finished first with 40.43% of the vote. Former  Democratic State Representative Les Gara and Jessica Cook came in second place, with 23.06% of the vote;  Independent former Alaska Governor  Bill Walker and Heidi Drygas finished in third place with 22.77% of the vote.

Walker and Dahlstrom won the general election in the first round of  ranked-choice voting with 50.29% of the vote.

State Legislature

Alaska State Senate 

19 of the state's 20 senate seats were up for election in 2022, with some elected for two-year terms and other for four-year terms due to redistricting. The Republican party lost two seats, while the Democratic party gained two seats for an eleven to nine seat split respectively. A bipartisan coalition of eight Republicans and nine Democrats was announced, electing Gary Stevens as Senate President.

Alaska House of Representatives 

All 40 seats of the Alaska House of Representatives were up in this election. Since 2016, the house has been governed by a coalition of democrats, independents, and some republicans. The coalition was re-elected to a majority, albeit with only 20 of the total 40 seats in the chamber, with 6 independents and 1 Republican joining all 13 Democrats. Republican Cathy Tilton was elected speaker, replacing Republican Louise Stutes.

Ballot Measure 
Ballot Measure 1 asked Alaskans whether a constitutional convention should be held, a vote that appears on ballots every ten years. The measure was supported by Governor Mike Dunleavy and opposed by the Alaskan Democratic Party.

The measure failed with 70.46% voting against.

Notes

References

Alaska elections
Alaska